Tușnad is a commune in Harghita County, Romania. It lies in the Székely Land, an ethno-cultural region in eastern Transylvania, and is composed of three villages:

Demographics
The commune has an absolute Székely Hungarian majority. According to the 2011 census it has a population of 2,117 which 92.73% or 1,963 are Hungarian.

Name
The village of Tusnád is often referred to as Tușnad-Sat or Tusnád-Falu to avoid confusion with the touristic centre of Băile Tușnad to the south. Romanian State Railways also makes this distinction.

Natives
 Iuliana Simon

References

Communes in Harghita County
Localities in Transylvania
Székely communities